Endre Granat (born August 3, 1937) is an American violinist. He is regarded as the most recorded violinist and concertmaster working in the studios today.

Early life and education

Granat studied at the Franz Liszt Academy, Jacobs School of Music at Indiana University Bloomington and the Thornton School of Music at the University of Southern California. Granat is a former Fulbright Scholar.

His teachers included Gyorgy Garay, Josef Gingold and Jascha Heifetz.

In 1962 Endre Granat won first prize at the International Competition in Heidelberg and he was a 1967 prize winner of the Queen Elizabeth International Competition in Brussels. He performs on an Italian "Domenicus Montagnana" 1721 violin.

Career
Granat is a former assistant concertmaster of the Cleveland Orchestra, concertmaster of the Gothenburg Symphony Orchestra, and concertmaster of the Pacific Symphony.  He is a laureate of the Queen Elisabeth Music Competition and a recipient of the Ysaye Medal.  Granat has been a frequent participant of the Marlboro Music Festival and the Casals Festival.

A former Fulbright scholar, he has taught at the Royal Academy of Music in Gothenburg, Seoul National University, the Cleveland Institute of Music, California State University at Northridge and the University of Southern California.

Granat is noted for his Urtext editions of violin concerti by Johannes Brahms, Felix Mendelssohn and Henryk Wieniawski as well as The Essential Sevcik. Granat is editor for the Heifetz Collection that include urtext editions of Heifetz' favorites as well as the Urtext Edition of Paganini 24 Caprices and THE HEIFETZ SCALE BOOK.

For many years one of the leading concertmaster for the Hollywood film industry, he was the leader for Miklos Rozsa, Elmer Bernstein, Jerry Goldsmith, John Williams, James Newton Howard, Henry Mancini, Hans Zimmer and a host of others.  Granat was the concertmaster of numerous awards ceremonies of the Academy Awards, the Emmy Awards and the Grammy Awards.  He has over 2,800 motion pictures and thousands television shows to his credit.

Granat has toured and recorded with numerous artists, including Earth, Wind, and Fire, Michael Jackson, Lionel Richie, Barbra Streisand, Yanni, Natalie Cole, Dionne Warwick, and Ricky Martin.

He was concertmaster for many recording studios that made soundtracks for films, including Ghostbusters (1984), Homeward Bound II: Lost in San Francisco (1996), Starship Troopers (1996), Anna and the King (1999), Legally Blonde (2001), The Bourne Identity (2002), Star Trek: Nemesis (2002), Dreamcatcher (2003), Looney Tunes: Back in Action (2003), The Last Samurai (2003), Peter Pan (2003),  The Terminal (2004), Transformers (2007), Pirates of the Caribbean: At World's End (2007), The Simpsons Movie (2007), and Frozen (2013).

See also

 List of classical violinists
 List of Indiana University (Bloomington) people
 List of University of Southern California people

References

Bio at Connolly
ASCAP 14th annual film score workshop 2002

External links
 
 
 

1937 births
Place of birth missing (living people)
20th-century Hungarian musicians
20th-century classical violinists
21st-century Hungarian musicians
21st-century classical violinists
American classical violinists
Male classical violinists
American male violinists
Cleveland Institute of Music faculty
Hungarian emigrants to the United States
Hungarian classical violinists
Jacobs School of Music alumni
Living people
Musicians from Cleveland
Musicians from Gothenburg
Prize-winners of the Queen Elisabeth Competition
Academic staff of Seoul National University
USC Thornton School of Music alumni
USC Thornton School of Music faculty
Classical musicians from California
Classical musicians from Ohio
20th-century American male musicians
21st-century American male musicians
20th-century American violinists
21st-century American violinists